Henry Monroe "Hank" Beachell (September 21, 1906 – December 13, 2006) was an American plant breeder. His research led to the development of hybrid rice cultivars that saved millions of people around the world from starvation.

Born in Waverly, Nebraska, Beachell and his family moved to a corn and wheat farm in western Nebraska. In 1930 he earned a bachelor's degegree in agronomy from the University of Nebraska–Lincoln, where he was a member of the FarmHouse fraternity. After obtaining a Master's degree at Kansas State University, Beachell worked for the U.S. Department of Agriculture in Texas. There, he created nine rice varieties, which eventually accounted for more than 90 percent of the U.S. long-grain rice production. He went to International Rice Research Institute (IRRI) in 1963 after his retirement from the DOA.  He created a high-yielding rice variety IR8 in 1964, based on the previous work by Peter Jennings (no relations to the US journalists). IR8 was officially released by IRRI in 1966.  It dramatically increased the yields of Asian rice from 1 or 2 ton per hectare to 4 or 5 tons per hectare.  It played a significant part in the Green Revolution.

Beachell has been called the most important person in rice improvement in the world. As farmers planted higher yielding rice, nutrition improved in many Asian countries, and farmers increased their incomes. Beachell was awarded a honorary doctorate from the University of Nebraska in 1972. Beachell has received many international awards, including the 1987 Japan Prize and 1996 World Food Prize. As a centenarian, Beachell consulted with RiceTec, the only commercial hybrid rice-breeding program in the U.S, up until his death.

References

External links
 RiceTec News Release on the occasion of Dr. Beachell's 100th birthday
 Texas A&M News Release regarding the 1990 World Food Prize

1906 births
2006 deaths
American biologists
American centenarians
Men centenarians
People from Lancaster County, Nebraska
University of Nebraska–Lincoln alumni
Kansas State University alumni
20th-century biologists
Agriculture and food award winners